Tullins is a commune in the Isère department in southeastern France.

Geography 

The agglomeration of Tullins is situated in forested foothills that flank Chambaran Plateau. At its foot lies the alluvial plain of the Isère, which is the agricultural and rural part of the area. The town is traversed by the Fure and bordered by the Isère.

The city is served by the Tullins-Fures train station on Grenoble line and the A49 autoroute, which can be accessed  from the city center.

Population

See also
Communes of the Isère department

References

Communes of Isère
Isère communes articles needing translation from French Wikipedia